Geoff Coffin (17 August 1924 – 12 March 2015) was a footballer who played as a centre forward for Heath Rangers, Chester and Winsford United. He was born in Chester.

References

1924 births
2015 deaths
Chester City F.C. players
Winsford United F.C. players
English footballers
People from Chester
Association football forwards